Matadi is the chief sea port of the Democratic Republic of the Congo and the capital of the Kongo Central province, adjacent to the border with Angola. It had a population of 245,862 (2004). It was founded by Sir Henry Morton Stanley in 1879.

History

Matadi was near the site of the state of Vungu, which was first mentioned in 1535  and was said to be destroyed in 1624.

Matadi itself was founded by Sir Henry Morton Stanley in 1879. It was strategically important because it was the last navigable port going upstream on the Congo River; it became the furthest inland port in the Congo Free State. The construction of the Matadi–Kinshasa Railway (built between 1890 and 1898) made it possible to transport goods from deeper within Congo's interior to the port of Matadi, stimulating the city to become an important trading center. Portuguese and French West-African commercial interests influenced the city's architecture and urban design, which borrowed from the neighboring colonies in Angola and the Congo-Brazzaville.

Culture 
The word Matadi means stone in the local Kikongo language. The town is built on steep hills. A local saying is that to live in Matadi, you must know the verbs "to go up", "to go down", and "to sweat". Upstream is a series of caves known as the "rock of Diogo Cão", after graffiti carved by the Portuguese explorer in 1485 marking the limit of his travels up the Congo River.

Yelala Rapids lies near the city.

Climate 
Matadi has a relatively dry tropical savanna climate (Köppen Aw) with a lengthy dry season from June to September due to the northerly extension of the cold, foggy Benguela Current.

Infrastructure 

The mouth of the Congo forms one of Africa's largest harbours. In addition to Matadi, which is the furthest upriver, three ports are located within it, the others being Boma and Banana in DR Congo and Soyo in Angola. Matadi serves as a major import and export point for the whole nation. Chief exports are coffee and timber.  The state fishing company "Pemarza" uses the port to supply fish to Kinshasa. Tshimpi Airport is nearby but is reportedly inactive because of continued warfare.

Matadi Bridge, a suspension bridge 722 m- long with a main span of 520 m, built in 1983, crosses the river just south of Matadi, carrying the main road linking Kinshasa to the coast. After passing through Matadi and over the bridge, it continues to Boma, Muanda and Banana. Although built as a mixed rail and road bridge, no rail line is now operating over the bridge. Matadi is the port railhead for the 366 km long Matadi-Kinshasa Railway, constructed to bypass the rapids on the river upstream. A monument to the builders of the railway stands on a nearby hill.

A power station on the M'pozo River supplies power to Matadi.

Port 

The maximum draft of the port is 8.2m. The Navy of the Democratic Republic of the Congo maintains one operational command at the port.

Media 
La Cité africaine de Matadi is a newspaper published in French in Matadi.

Gallery

See also
 Lake Chad replenishment project
 Waterway

References

Further reading

External links 

 Description of Matadi

 
Populated places in Kongo Central
Populated places established in 1879
Library of Congress Africa Collection related
1879 establishments in Africa